Club de Fútbol Talavera de la Reina is a Spanish football club based in Talavera de la Reina, in the autonomous community of Castilla–La Mancha.

Founded in 2011 after the merge of CF Talavera and Real Talavera CD, it plays in Primera División RFEF – Group 1, holding home matches at Estadio El Prado, with a 5,000-seat capacity.

History 
In 2011, Club de Fútbol Talavera de la Reina was founded by the merge of two clubs, CF Talavera and Real Talavera CD.

The club won Tercera División, Group 18 in the 2016–2017 season and promoted to Segunda División B.

At the end 2021–22 season, Talavera was relegated to newly fourth division, Segunda División RFEF. But 3 months later, Talavera filling Internacional de Madrid place in third division who was resigned from competition due economic problems.

Season to season

2 season in Primera División RFEF
5 seasons in Segunda División B
4 seasons in Tercera División

Current squad
.

Reserve team

Out on loan

See also
Talavera CF

References 
Informational notes

Citations

Bibliography

External links
Official website 
Club & stadium history - Estadios de España 

Football clubs in Castilla–La Mancha
Association football clubs established in 2011
2011 establishments in Spain
Sport in Talavera de la Reina
Primera Federación clubs